Yorkis Miguel Vargas Pérez (born September 30, 1967) is a former Major League Baseball pitcher. The left-hander appeared in 337 games over nine seasons for the Chicago Cubs, Florida Marlins, New York Mets, Philadelphia Phillies, Houston Astros and Baltimore Orioles, all as a relief pitcher.

Career
He signed a minor league deal with Baltimore just before the start of the 2002 season after he was released by the Arizona Diamondbacks during the last week of spring training. After spending almost the entire first half of the campaign with the Rochester Red Wings, his contract was purchased by the Orioles on June 25. He went 0–0 with one save and a 3.29 earned run average (ERA) in 23 appearances before an appendectomy on September 12 ended his season. He was released nineteen days later on October 1.

Personal
Yorkis has three cousins (all brothers) that have played in the major leagues: Melido Pérez, Pascual Pérez, and Carlos Pérez. His son, Leurys Vargas, was a member of the Seattle Mariners organization from 2012-2015.

References

External links

1967 births
Living people
Baltimore Orioles players
Binghamton Mets players
Charlotte Knights players
Chicago Cubs players
Dominican Republic expatriate baseball players in Canada
Dominican Republic expatriate baseball players in Japan
Dominican Republic expatriate baseball players in the United States
Elizabethton Twins players
Florida Marlins players
Harrisburg Senators players
Houston Astros players
Indianapolis Indians players
Jacksonville Expos players
Kenosha Twins players

Major League Baseball pitchers
Major League Baseball players from the Dominican Republic
New York Mets players
Nippon Professional Baseball pitchers
Norfolk Tides players
Ottawa Lynx players
People from Bajos de Haina
Portland Sea Dogs players
Philadelphia Phillies players
Reading Phillies players
Richmond Braves players
Rochester Red Wings players
Scranton/Wilkes-Barre Red Barons players
West Palm Beach Expos players
Yomiuri Giants players